The 1899 Wellington City mayoral election was part of the New Zealand local elections held that same year. The polling was conducted using the standard first-past-the-post electoral method.

Background
In 1899 incumbent Mayor John Rutherford Blair retired leading to local businessman John Aitken being elected to office as Mayor of Wellington, beating challenges from both Kennedy Macdonald (a former councillor) and James Joseph Devine.

Mayoralty results
The following table gives the election results:

Notes

References

Mayoral elections in Wellington
1899 elections in New Zealand
Politics of the Wellington Region
1890s in Wellington